Hélder d'Oliveira (21 August 1934 – 13 January 2018) was a Portuguese sailor. He competed at the 1960 Summer Olympics and the 1964 Summer Olympics.

References

External links
 

1934 births
2018 deaths
Portuguese male sailors (sport)
Olympic sailors of Portugal
Sailors at the 1960 Summer Olympics – Finn
Sailors at the 1964 Summer Olympics – Finn
Sportspeople from Lisbon